The Villanovan culture (c. 900–700 BC), regarded as the earliest phase of the Etruscan civilization, was the earliest Iron Age culture of Italy. It directly followed the Bronze Age Proto-Villanovan culture which branched off from the Urnfield culture of Central Europe. The name derives from the locality of Villanova, a fraction of the municipality of Castenaso in the Metropolitan City of Bologna where, between 1853 and 1855, Giovanni Gozzadini found the remains of a necropolis, bringing to light 193 tombs, of which there were 179 cremations and 14 inhumations.

The Villanovans introduced iron-working to the Italian Peninsula. They practiced cremation and buried the ashes of their dead in pottery urns of distinctive double-cone shape.

History

The name Villanovan of the early phases of the Etruscan civilization comes from the site of the first archaeological finds relating to this advanced culture, which were remnants of a cemetery found near Villanova (Castenaso, 12 kilometres south-east of Bologna) in northern Italy. The excavation lasting from 1853 to 1855 was done by the scholar and site owner, count Giovanni Gozzadini, and involved 193 tombs, six of which were separated from the rest as if to signify a special social status. The "well tomb" pit graves lined with stones contained funerary urns. These had been only sporadically plundered and most were untouched. In 1893, a chance discovery unearthed another distinctive Villanovan necropolis at Verucchio overlooking the Adriatic coastal plain.

The burial characteristics relate the Villanovan culture to the Central European Urnfield culture (c. 1300–750 BC) and Celtic Hallstatt culture that succeeded the Urnfield culture. It is not possible to tell these apart in their earlier stages. Cremated remains were placed in cinerary urns, specifically in biconical urns and then buried. The urns were a form of Villanovan pottery known as impasto. A custom believed to originate with the Villanovan culture is the usage of hut-shaped urns, which were cinerary urns fashioned like the huts in which the villagers lived. Typical sgraffito decorations of swastikas, meanders, and squares were scratched with a comb-like tool. Urns were accompanied by simple bronze fibulae, razors and rings.

Periodization
The Villanovan culture is broadly divided into Villanovan I from c. 960 BC to c. 801 BC and the Villanovan II from c. 800 BC to 720 BC. The later phase (Villanovan II) saw radical changes, evidence of contact with Hellenic civilization and trade with the north along the Amber Road. This evidence takes the form of glass and amber necklaces for women, armor and horse harness fittings of bronze, and the development of elite graves in contrast to the earlier egalitarian culture. Chamber tombs and inhumation (burial) practices were developed side-by-side with the earlier cremation practices. With the last phase of Villanovan II the Etruscans, in particular Southern Etruria, entered the Orientalizing period. The northernmost areas of the Etruscan world, such as Etruria Padana, continued in their development as Villanovan III (750–680 BC)  and Villanovan IV (680–540 BC).

Villanovan chronology within the Etruscan civilization

Metalwork and trade 
The metalwork quality found in bronze and pottery demonstrate the skill of the Villanovan artisans. Some grave goods from burial sites display an even higher quality, suggesting the development of societal elites within Villanovan culture. Tools and items were placed in graves suggesting a belief in an afterlife. Men's graves contained weapons, armor, while those for women included weaving tools. A few graves switched or mixed these, indicating the possibility that some women employed tools and that some men made clothing.

During the Villanovan period Etruscans traded with other states from the Mediterranean such as Greeks, Balkans, and Sardinia. Trade brought about advancement in metallurgy, and Greek presence influenced Villanovan pottery.

Housing 
Buildings were rectangular in shape. The people lived in small huts, made of wattle and daub with wooden poles for support. Within the huts, cooking stands, utensils and charred animal bones give evidence about the family life of early inhabitants in Italy. Some huts contained large pottery jars for food storage sunk into their floors. There was also a rock cut drain to channel rainwater to communal reservoirs.

Villanovan settlements 
Generally speaking, Villanovan settlements were centered in the Adriatic Etruria, in Emilia Romagna (in particular, in Bologna and in Verucchio, near Rimini), in Marche (Fermo), and in the Tyrrhenian Etruria, in Tuscany and Lazio. Further south, Villanovan cremation burials are to be found in Campania, at Capua, at the "princely tombs" of Pontecagnano near Salerno, at Capo di Fiume, at Vallo di Diano and at Sala Consilina.

Small scattered Villanovan settlements have left few traces other than their more permanent burial sites, which were set somewhat apart from the settlements—largely because the settlement sites were built over in Etruscan times. Modern opinion generally follows Massimo Pallottino in regarding the Villanovan culture as ancestral to the Etruscan civilization.

Genetics
A genetic study published in Science in November 2019 examined the remains of a female from the Villanovan culture buried in Veio Grotta Gramiccia, Italy between ca. 900 BC and 800 BC. She carried the maternal haplogroup K1a4, found all over Europe since Neolithic times, and her autosomal DNA was a mixture of 72.9% Copper Age ancestry (EEF + WHG) and 27.1% Steppe-related ancestry. There was evidence for consanguinity for this sample with another ancient sample (700 BCE - 600 BCE) from the Etruscan necropolis of La Mattonara near Civitavecchia, compatible with being the latter an offspring of third-degree relatives from the former.

See also
Etruscans
Proto-Villanovan culture
Prehistoric Italy

Notes

References

Sources and further reading

 
 
Giovanni Gozzadini, La nécropole de Villanova, Fava et Garagnani, Bologna, 1870
J. P. Mallory, "Villanovan Culture", Encyclopedia of Indo-European Culture, (Fitzroy Dearborn), 1997.
Gilda Bartoloni,  "The origin and diffusion of Villanovan culture." in M. Torelli,   (editor) The Etruscans, pp 53–74. (Milan), 2000.
 Mary E. Moser, The "Southern Villanovan" Culture of Campania, (Ann Arbor), 1982.
David Ridgway, "The Villanovan Cemeteries of Bologna and Pontecagnano" in Journal of Roman Archaeology 7: pp 303–16 (1994)
David Ridgway, The World of the Early Etruscans, Göteborgs Universitet: The Félix Neubergh Lecture, 2000.
Perkins, Phil (2017). DNA and Etruscan identity. In: Naso, Alessandro ed. Etruscology. Berlin: De Gruyter, pp. 109–118. URL: https://www.degruyter.com/view/product/128551

External links

Museo Archeologico di Verucchio: Villanovan necropolis (in English)
Ashmolean Museum: Ancient Italy Before the Romans
 Images of Villanovan hut-urn

 
11th-century BC establishments
7th-century BC disestablishments
1853 archaeological discoveries
Etruscans
Archaeological cultures of Southern Europe
Archaeological cultures in Italy
Bronze Age cultures of Europe
Iron Age cultures of Europe
Italic archaeological cultures
Prehistoric Italy